This article lists political parties in Aruba. Aruba has a multi-party system, with two or three strong parties and a third party that is electorally successful.

The parties
The native party names are either in Dutch, Spanish or mostly in  Papiamento.

Parties represented in Parliament

Minor parties
 Aruban Patriotic Party (Partido Patriotico di Aruba) Democratic Network (Red Democratico)
 Progressive Patriotic Union (Union Patriotico Progresista) social democrats
 Proud and Respected People (Pueblo Orguyoso y Respeta)
 People First (Pueblo Prome)
 United Christians Reinforcing the Potential of Aruba (Cristiannan Uni Reforzando Potencial diAruba)
 Youth Bringing Change (Hubentud Trecidendo Cambio)

Inactive parties
 Aruban Democratic Alliance (Aliansa Democratico Arubano)
 Aruban Liberal Organization (Organisacion Liberal Arubano)
 Aruban Patriotic Movement (Movimiento Patriotico Arubano)
 Concentration for the Liberation of Aruba (Concentracion pa Liberacion di Aruba) libertarian-socialists
 National Democratic Action (Accion Democratico National'') nationalists

See also
 Politics of Aruba
 List of political parties by country

References

Aruba
 
Aruba
+Aruba
Political parties